Igor Berdichevski (born July 15, 1964, Moscow, Russia) is a Russian chess grandmaster, author, and FIDE Trainer. He received the grandmaster title in 1996.  Berdichevski retired from international chess play in 2002. He is the author of an encyclopedia on Jewish chess players, Modern Practice 1 Nc6 (1998), and World Chess Championship Matches (2002).

Notable Tournaments

References 

1964 births
Chess grandmasters
Russian chess players
Living people
Russian writers